Eugene Michael "Gene" Peacosh (born September 28, 1948) is a retired professional ice hockey player who played 367 games in the World Hockey Association.  He played with the New York Raiders, New York Golden Blades, Jersey Knights, San Diego Mariners, Edmonton Oilers and Indianapolis Racers.

Gene Peacosh was one of the best hockey players to come out of British Columbia during the late 1960s and early 70s. Despite being born in Manitoba, he grew up in the Okanagan Valley in British Columbia, and that is where his hockey career began. As a junior, Gene quickly established himself as a prolific goal scorer. He was drafted into major junior hockey and continued to top team and league scoring statistics. 

From 1968-69 to 1971-72, Gene played for the  Johnstown Jets in the Eastern Hockey League. Gene scored over 100 points in each of his last three seasons, after totaling 87 in his first year. He scored at least 43 goals each of these seasons.

After turning down a contract from the Montreal Canadiens, Gene decided instead to play in the World Hockey Association. Gene's scoring touch remained constant as a pro, averaging approximately a goal every other game. He occupies a high position in the WHA record books as his 330 points in 5 seasons are the 33rd highest total recorded in the circuit.

Gene scored 37 goals as a rookie in the WHA. He scored only 21 goals the following season, but then registered two impressive seasons with the San Diego Mariners scoring 43 and 37 goals respectively. Gene was still putting the puck into the net in 1976-77, despite being moved from San Diego to the Edmonton Oilers, and finally to the Indianapolis Racers .

Career Achievements:
1967 Won the BCHL (BCJHL) scoring championship with 94 points, while playing for the Penticton Broncos. Gene led the team to win both the regular season championship and Fred Page post-season championship as well.

External links

1948 births
Living people
Canadian ice hockey centres
Edmonton Oilers (WHA) players
Indianapolis Racers players
Jersey Knights players
New York Golden Blades players
New York Raiders players
San Diego Mariners players